The Bharatiya Nabhikiya Vidyut Nigam Limited (BHAVINI) is a wholly owned Enterprise of Government of India under the administrative control of the Department of Atomic Energy incorporated on 22 October 2003 as Public Limited Company under the companies act, 1956 with the objective of constructing and commissioning the first 500 MWe Fast Breeder Reactor (FBR) at Kalpakkam in Tamil Nadu and to pursue construction, commissioning, operation and maintenance of subsequent Fast Breeder Reactors for generation of electricity in pursuance of the schemes and programmes of Government of India under the provisions of the Atomic Energy Act,  1962.
BHAVINI is currently constructing a 500MWe Prototype Fast Breeder Reactor at Kalpakkam, 70 km from Chennai.

BHAVINI is administered by the Department of Atomic Energy. Once the first fast breeder reactor, called Prototype Fast Breeder Reactor goes into commercial power production, BHAVINI will be the second power utility in India after Nuclear Power Corporation of India, to use nuclear fuel sources to generate power.

See also
 Prototype Fast Breeder Reactor
 FBR-600
 Indira Gandhi Centre for Atomic Research
 Nuclear Power Corporation of India
 Nuclear power in India

References

External links
BHAVINI website 

2004 establishments in Tamil Nadu
Nuclear power companies of India
Energy companies established in 2004
Companies based in Chennai